Aaron Lebedeff (1873–1960) was a Yiddish theatre star, born in Gomel, Belarus.

Life and career
In childhood he sang for the Hazzan, Borekh David. Having no interest in education, he was sent to learn a trade, but soon he ran away and began to play small roles in a Russian theaters in Bobruysk, Minsk and other towns. When the Russian troupe fell apart, he went back to Homel, taking part in amateur theatre and opening a dance club. When Leyzer Bernshtein's troupe arrived, he wheedled a place in it.

He was officially a chorister, unofficially a roadie/stage hand (pekl-treger). He dressed the actors and was a prompter. He finally debuted in Der Pipkiner rav and became the character actor he would remain, playing in different wandering theatre troupes across Russia. He was hired in Warsaw and became popular there as Der Litvisher Komiker (The Litvak comic). In 1912–13, he played in Łódź with Zandberg, then back to Warsaw; and at the outbreak of World War I, he was pressed into the Russian army and sent to Harbin, Manchuria, (1916), where he spent his time of military service giving concerts for the officers.

After being demobilized, he worked in Avrom Fishzohn's troupe; but in order to support himself, he often had to sing in Russian or English for the American Red Cross.

He married Vera Lubow and later wandered toward Japan with his wife, presenting "International Concerts" (also in China). In 1920, he and his wife left for America and were hired for Boris Thomashevsky's National Theater production of Wolf Shumsky's Lyavke Molodyetz. He was such a hit that he became an overnight star of Yiddish theater in America.

Aaron died on November 8, 1960, and was buried next to his wife (who died two years prior) in the Yiddish Theatrical Alliance section of Mount Hebron Cemetery in Queens, NY.

Lebedeff's musicals

Here are most of the shows he starred in during the 1920s:

  (Yehude Boymvol)
  (Julius Adler)
  and Yoshke Khvat (Yitskhok Lesh) (music Herman Wohl)
  (Lively and Happy) (music Herman Wohl)
  (Harry Kalmanovitsh, music Herman Wohl)
  (1001 nights) (Boris Thomashevsky, music Herman Wohl)
  (Dance, Sing and Cry) (music Joseph Chernyavsky)
  (Israel Rosenberg, L. and S. Rozenstein)
  (Rumanian wedding), (Moyse Shor, music Perez Sandler)
  (The Father's Little Son) (Kalmanovitsh, music Perets Sandler)
 Mendl in Japan (Rakov, music Peretz Sandler)
  (Israel Rosenberg, music Peretz Sandler)
 A khasene in Palestine (Rosenberg - Sandler)
  (L. Freeman - Sandler)
 Volodke in Odessa (Lesh - Sandler)
  (Freyman - Sandler)
  (The little millionaire) (Aaron Nager - Sholom Secunda)
  (William Siegel - music Alexander Olshanetsky)
  (Paradise For Two) (William Siegel - Olshanetsky)
  (Isidore Lesh, music Olshanetsky)
  (Siegel - Olshanetsky)
  (Yitskhok Lesh - Olshanetsky)
  (Israel Rosenberg - Olshanetsky)
  (Kalmanovitsh)

In the 1930s:
  (William Siegel, music Herman Wohl)
  (Russian love) (Yitskhok Lesh - Wohl)
  (A night in the woods) (Siegel - Wohl)
  (The lucky night) (Siegel - Wohl)
  (The great miracle) (Avrom Blum - Wohl)
  (Rich paupers) (Siegel - Wohl)
  (The big surprise) (Blum - Wohl)

In his traveling troupes, he also presented:
 Max and Abraham Goldfaden's Beyde Kuni Lemel
  (Goldfaden)
  (The wild man) (Jacob Mikhailovich Gordin)
 Morgen (Chone Gottesfeld)

Lebedeff was a coupletist, composing dozens of comic songs for the Broadway Record Company; he recorded hundreds of sides including the famous Rumania, Rumania and Vot ken yu makh, s'iz amerike!.

References

External links
 Aaron Lebedeff recordings at the Discography of American Historical Recordings.

People from Gomel
Jewish American male actors
American people of Belarusian-Jewish descent
Yiddish theatre performers
Yiddish-language singers
Belarusian Jews
1873 births
1960 deaths
Burials at Mount Hebron Cemetery (New York City)